Abu Khalil Qabbani ( / ALA-LC: Abū Khalīl al-Qabbānī; 1835–1902) was a Syrian playwright and composer of Turkish origin. He is considered to be the founder of the short musical play (similar to an operetta) in Arabic theatre. His play Abu al-Hassan al-Mughaffal caused a wave of protest as a result of his mockery of Caliph Harun al-Rashid.

He used to give female roles in his plays to younger boys with high pitched voices because women were not allowed to act in theatre, this enraged religious figured who sent a delegation to complain to the caliph and this ended with a decree by the Ottoman government to close his theatre, the only Avant Garde theatre in the region, and prevent theatrical performances in Syria. 

After that, Qabbani left for Egypt and produced his plays there until 1900. He returned to Syria and died two years later in 1902. He dreamt of establishing a Broadway district in Damascus,He is considered the "Father of Syrian theatre", and has influenced later generations including the Syrian actor Duraid Lahham. His brother is the grandfather of poet Nizar Qabbani. He also performed in Turkey and America.

Works about Abu Khalil Qabbani 
Syrian playwright Saadallah Wannous wrote a play called Evening with Abu Khalil Qabbani about him, and Khairy Alzahaby represented him in the epic series Abu Khalil Qabbani.

See also
List of Syrians
List of playwrights

References

Turks from the Ottoman Empire
Syrian dramatists and playwrights
Syrian people of Turkish descent
People from Damascus
1902 deaths
1835 births
19th-century dramatists and playwrights
Qabbani family